Document-based question
 Dubuque Regional Airport, 
 dBq , the gain of an antenna compared to a quarter wavelength whip.
 Dave Brubeck Quartet